Dennis Kennedy (born 1940, Cincinnati, Ohio, United States), is an author of books on theater and performance. He is also a playwright, director, and fiction writer. He holds dual citizenship in the USA and Ireland. His recent book on audiences, The Spectator and the Spectacle, was widely and positively reviewed.

Career
His academic career has been international in scope, ranging from Michigan to Pittsburgh to Ireland, where he was Beckett Professor of Drama in Trinity College Dublin (1994-2006).  He is now emeritus professor and fellow at Trinity College Dublin. He has also held numerous distinguished visiting positions in universities in Pakistan, Singapore, China, Canada, and the United States. He has twice been a fellow of the National Endowment for the Humanities, twice won the TLA's George Freedley Memorial Award for Theater History, and was elected to the Royal Irish Academy and Academia Europaea. His more than forty essays  have appeared in wide-ranging publications. He has lectured around the world from London to Shanghai, and regularly gives workshops in acting Shakespeare.  His own plays have been performed in New York, London, and elsewhere. Recent productions he has directed on stage include As You Like It by William Shakespeare in Beijing, China and The Caucasian Chalk Circle by Bertolt Brecht in Dublin, Ireland.

His short stories appear in a number of literary journals, including Confrontation, New Letters, Underground Voices, Witness, War, Literature & the Arts and Drunken Boat.

His daughter Miranda Kennedy is a journalist and author, and his twin daughters Jessica and Megan Kennedy are dancers who direct a dance-theater company in Dublin called Junk Ensemble.

Works
Books by Kennedy include The Oxford Companion to Theatre and Performance (Oxford University Press, 2010, 2011), Shakespeare in Asia: Contemporary Performance with Yong Li Lan, (Cambridge University Press, 2010), which was reviewed in Shakespeare Quarterly and Asian Theatre Journal, and The Spectator and the Spectacle: Audiences in Modernity and Postmodernity (Cambridge, 2009). His other books are The Oxford Encyclopedia of Theatre and Performance (Oxford, 2003), Looking at Shakespeare: A Visual History of Twentieth-Century Performance (Cambridge, 2001, 1993), which was reviewed in both Theatre Research International and Theatre Survey. Kennedy's book Foreign Shakespeare (Cambridge, 1993), was also reviewed in Theatre Research International, among other journals. His first book is Granville Barker and the Dream of Theatre (Cambridge, 1985).

References

Living people
1940 births
American expatriate academics
20th-century American dramatists and playwrights
Academics of Trinity College Dublin
Writers from Cincinnati
20th-century American non-fiction writers